A private investigator (often abbreviated to PI and informally called a private eye), a private detective, or inquiry agent is a person who can be hired by individuals or groups to undertake investigatory law services. Private investigators often work for attorneys in civil and criminal cases.

History

In 1833, Eugène François Vidocq, a French soldier, criminal, and privateer, founded the first known private detective agency, "Le Bureau des Renseignements Universels pour le commerce et l'Industrie" ("The Office of Universal Information For Commerce and Industry") and hired ex-convicts. Much of what private investigators did in the early days was to act as the police in matters for which their clients felt the police were not equipped or willing to do. Official law enforcement tried many times to shut it down.  In 1842, police arrested him in suspicion of unlawful imprisonment and taking money on false pretences after he had solved an embezzlement case. Vidocq later suspected that it had been a set-up. He was sentenced to five years and fined 3,000 francs, but the Court of Appeals released him. Vidocq is credited with having introduced record-keeping, criminology, and ballistics to criminal investigation. He made the first plaster casts of shoe impressions. He created indelible ink and unalterable bond paper with his printing company. His form of anthropometrics is still partially used by French police. He is also credited for philanthropic pursuits – he claimed he never informed on anyone who had stolen for real need.

In the United Kingdom, Charles Frederick Field set up an enquiry office upon his retirement from the Metropolitan Police in 1852. Field became a friend of Charles Dickens, and the latter wrote articles about him. In 1862, one of his employees, the Hungarian Ignatius Paul Pollaky, left him and set up a rival agency. Although little-remembered today, Pollaky's fame at the time was such that he was mentioned in various books of the 1870s and immortalized as "Paddington" Pollaky for his "keen penetration" in the 1881 comic opera, Patience.

In the United States, Allan Pinkerton established the Pinkerton National Detective Agency – a private detective agency – in 1850. Pinkerton became famous when he foiled a plot to assassinate then President-elect Abraham Lincoln in 1861. Pinkerton's agents performed services which ranged from undercover investigations and detection of crimes, to plant protection and armed security. At the height of its existence, the number of Pinkerton National Detective Agency active agents and reserves rivaled the number of active soldiers and reserves in the United States Army. Allan Pinkerton hired Kate Warne in 1856 as a private detective, making her the first female private detective in America.

A larger role for this new private investigative industry was to assist companies in labor disputes. Some early private investigators provided armed guards to act as a private militia. During the union unrest in the US in the late 19th century, industrialists would hire Pinkerton agents as undercover operatives to infiltrate and disrupt union activity or serve as armed guards for factories. In the aftermath of the Homestead Riot of 1892, several states passed so-called "anti-Pinkerton" laws restricting the importation of private security guards during union strikes. The federal Anti-Pinkerton Act of 1893 continues to prohibit an "individual employed by the Pinkerton Detective Agency, or similar organization" from being employed by "the Government of the United States or the government of the District of Columbia."

Pinkerton agents were also hired to track western outlaws Jesse James, the Reno brothers, and the Wild Bunch, including Butch Cassidy and the Sundance Kid.

Employment 
Many private detectives/investigators with special academic and practical experience often work with defense attorneys on capital punishment and other criminal defense cases. Others are insurance investigators who investigate suspicious claims. Before the advent of no-fault divorce, many private investigators sought evidence of adultery or other conduct within marriage to establish grounds for a divorce. Despite the lack of legal necessity for such evidence in many jurisdictions, according to press reports, collecting evidence of spouses' and partners' adultery or other "bad behaviour" is still one of their most profitable undertakings, as the stakes being fought over now are child custody, alimony, or marital property disputes.

Private investigators can also perform due diligence for an investor considering investing with an investment group, fund manager, or other high-risk business or investment venture. This could help the prospective investor avoid being the victim of fraud. A licensed and experienced investigator could reveal the investment is risky and/or the investor has a suspicious background. This is called investigative due diligence, and is becoming more prevalent in the 21st century with the public reports of large-scale Ponzi schemes and other fraudulent investment vehicles.

There are also cases of corrupt private detectives who, at times, have been known to work for criminals such as stalkers and crime bosses to track down escaped victims, rival criminals and/or witnesses that have gone into hiding or to gather compromising evidence against witnesses, informants, prosecutors and/or police investigators that could be used in upcoming trials.

Responsibilities
Private investigators also engage in a variety of work not often associated with the industry in the mind of the public. For example, many are involved in process serving, the personal delivery of summons, subpoenas, and other legal documents to parties in a legal case. The tracing of absconding debtors can also form a large part of a PI's work load. Many agencies specialize in a particular field of expertise. For example, some PI agencies deal only in tracing.

A handful of firms specialize in technical surveillance counter-measures, sometimes called electronic counter measures, which is the locating and dealing with unwanted forms of electronic surveillance (for example, a bugged boardroom for industrial espionage purposes). This niche service is typically conducted by those with backgrounds in intelligence/counterintelligence, executive protection, and a small number from law enforcement entities whose duties included the covert installation of eavesdropping devices as a tool in organized crime, terrorism and narco-trafficking investigations. 

Other PIs, also known as corporate investigators, specialize in corporate matters, including antifraud work, loss prevention, internal investigations of employee misconduct (such as Equal Employment Opportunities violations and sexual harassment), the protection of intellectual property and trade secrets, antipiracy, copyright infringement investigations, due diligence investigations, malware and cyber criminal activity, and computer forensics work. Some PIs act as professional witnesses where they observe situations with a view to reporting the actions or lack of them to a court or to gather evidence in antisocial behavior.

Undercover investigator
An undercover investigator, undercover detective, or undercover agent is a person who conducts investigations of suspected or confirmed criminal activity while impersonating a disinterested third party. Undercover investigators often infiltrate a suspected insurgent group, posing as a person interested in purchasing illegal goods or services with the ultimate aim of obtaining information about their assigned target.

Many undercover investigators carry hidden cameras and recorders strapped to their bodies to help them document their investigations. The period of the investigation could last for several months, or in some extreme cases, years. Due to the dangerous nature of the job, their real identities are kept secret throughout their active careers.
Economic investigations, business intelligence and information on competitors, security advice, special security services information, criminal investigation, investigations background, and profile polygraph tests are all typical examples of such a role.

Certain types of undercover investigators, depending on their employer, will investigate allegations of abuse of workman's compensation. Those claiming to be injured are often investigated and recorded with a hidden camera/recorder. This is then presented in court or to the client who paid for the investigation.

Across the world 
Many jurisdictions require PIs to be licensed. Depending on local laws, they may or may not carry a firearm. Equipment can vary greatly, but generally involves a wide variety of surveillance equipment and recording devices. While PIs may investigate criminal matters, they typically do not hold any law enforcement authority by virtue of the position, regardless of licensure. Private investigators’ authority is usually identical to other citizens’ (off-duty or retired law enforcement officers serving as a PI may retain their police powers at all times, depending on the jurisdiction). They are expected to keep detailed notes and to be prepared to testify in court regarding any of their observations on behalf of their clients, irregular hours may also be required when performing surveillance work.   Great care is required to remain within the scope of the law; otherwise, the private investigator may face criminal charges. However, there are also cases across the world, of corrupt or rogue private investigators who have obtained people's private data and information through illegal means. These include phone hacking, pretexting, identity theft and other illegal means of accessing government, insurance and police databases to obtain highly sensitive private information on their targets.

Australia
Private investigators in Australia must be licensed by the licensing authority relevant to the state where they are located. This applies to all states except the Australian Capital Territory. Companies offering investigation services must also hold a business licence and all their operatives must hold individual licences. Generally, the licences are administered and regulated by the state police; however, in some states, this can also be managed by other government agencies.

To become registered in New South Wales requires a CAPI licence, which can be applied for through the NSW Police Force website.
The Australian Capital Territory does not require PIs to be licensed, although they are still bound by legislation. PIs working in the ACT cannot enter the NSW area without a CAPI license, else they will be in breach of the law.
In Queensland, a private investigator need to be licensed under the Queensland Government and apply for a private investigator licence by completing an application for a security provider licence. Applicant will need to have a criminal history check and submit fingerprint.

UK
In 2001, the government passed the licensing of private investigators and private investigation firms in the UK over to the Security Industry Authority (SIA), which acted as the regulatory body from then on. However, due to the cutbacks of this agency, licensing of private investigators in the UK was halted indefinitely. At present, no government-backed authorities in the UK license private investigators.

The SIA have announced that PIs in the UK were to become licensed for the first time from May 2015, but this is only the scheduled date for the issue to be discussed in parliament. In December 2014, Corporate Livewire produced an article written by a UK private investigator at BAR Investigations, addressing the issues surrounding private investigation in the UK.

United States
Private investigators in the United States may or may not be licensed or registered by a government licensing authority or state police of the state where they are located. Licensing varies from state to state and can range from: a) no state license required; b) city or state business license required (such as in five states (Idaho, Alaska, Mississippi, South Dakota, and Wyoming); c) to needing several years of experience and licensing-related training classes and testing (as is the case with Virginia, West Virginia, and California). In many states, companies offering investigation services must hold an agency license, and all of their investigators or detectives must hold individual licenses or registrations; furthermore, certain states such as Washington have separate classes of licensing for roles such as trainers of private investigators. A few reciprocity agreements allow a detective working in one state to continue work in another for a limited time without getting a separate license, but not all states participate in these agreements.

In 1877, Colorado became the first state in the union to institute licensing requirements for private investigators, as stated in the 1877 Legislative Manual. In 1977, when El Paso County challenged a local security company's right to conduct investigations without a license, Colorado Supreme Court declared the licensing law too vague because it didn't adequately define a "detective business" and struck it down. Following this, several private investigators formed Professional Private Investigators Association of Colorado (PPIAC) in order to try to get the licensing laws reinstated, but the bills died in the General Assembly. On June 10, 2011, Governor John Hickenlooper signed into law Colorado House Bill 1195, which reinstated licenses for private investigators on voluntary basis effective July 1, 2012. A license applicant would have to be of 21 years of age or older, hold United States citizenship and have at least 4,000 hours of work experience as an investigator or part of a local, state or federal law enforcement agency; or 2,000 hours with post-secondary education.

On June 6, 2014, Hickenlooper signed into law Senate Bill 133, which effective June 1, 2015, made licensure mandatory. This split the licenses into two categories: Class I, requiring the applicant to be 21 years of age or older, hold United States citizenship and pass the Colorado Jurisprudence Exam. Class II requires in addition to Class I requirements a minimum of 4,000 hours of work experience as an investigator or part of a local, state or federal law enforcement agency. In 2019, following a review, the Colorado Department of Regulatory Agencies' Office of Policy, Research and Regulatory Reform suggested licensure requirement elimination, predicting "little to no consumer harm". In June 2020, Governor Jared Polis vetoed House Bill 1207 to keep licensure requirements, causing the licensure requirements to expire on August 31, 2021.

Florida has 3 types of licenses - Class CC for private investigator intern, C for private investigator, and MA for manager of a private investigative agency. As Class C license requires at least 2 years of experience, most applicants start with Class CC, which allows them to work under a sponsorship of a licensed Class C investigator.

For a Private Investigator License in New York, an investigator needs 3 years of verifiable experience, and to pass a NY State Department of State Division of licensing Services exam.

In 1893 a federal law was passed explicitly barring the government from employing the Pinkerton Detective Agency or a similar agency.

Canada
Private investigators in Canada are licensed at the provincial level by the appropriate body. For instance, in the province of Ontario, private investigators are licensed and regulated by the Ministry of Community Safety & Correctional Services (MCSCS). In the province of Alberta, private investigators are licensed and regulated by the Alberta Justice and Solicitor General. Similar licensing requirements apply in other provinces and territories of Canada. As per the Ontario text of the Private Security and Investigative Services Act of 2005, private investigators are forbidden from referring to themselves as detective or private detective. In order to become a licensed private investigator, you must be 18 years of age or older in Ontario (in other Provinces and territories of Canada the eligible age to work may be higher); have a clean criminal record or obtain a waiver; and submit a correctly completed application for a license. You are required to complete 50-hours of basic training with an accredited source such as a university, college, or through private agencies licensed to administer the course. Upon completion of basic training, individuals are required to write and pass the basic test to obtain a private investigator's license.

Fiction

The PI genre in fiction dates to Edgar Allan Poe, who created the character C. Auguste Dupin in the 1840s. Dupin, an amateur crime-solver residing in Paris, appeared in three Poe stories. In addition, Sherlock Holmes, created by Arthur Conan Doyle in the late 1880s, is arguably the most prominent private investigator in fiction.

Notable private investigators

In reality 

 P. Balasubramaniam
 Rick Crouch
 David Fechheimer
 Charles Frederick Field
 Dashiell Hammett (also a notable author of detective fiction)
 Justin Hopson
 Rajani Pandit
 Anthony Pellicano
 Allan Pinkerton
 Josiah "Tink" Thompson
 Eugène François Vidocq
 Kate Warne
 David P. Weber

In fiction 
Where the characters below do not meet the strict criteria of a private investigator (i.e. available for hire) it is noted in brackets.

American

Richard Diamond
Harry Dresden
Rachel Mariana Morgan
Peter Gunn
Mike Hammer
Philip Marlowe
Kinsey Millhone
Ezekiel "Easy" Rawlins
John Shaft
Sam Spade
Spenser
V. I. Warshawski
Nero Wolfe
Jack Reacher
Sunny Randall
Johnny Dollar

Bengali

Arjun
Byomkesh Bakshi
Parashor Barma
Feluda
Jayanta-Manik
Mitin Masi
Bhaduri Moshai
Kiriti Roy
Colonel Niladri Sarkar
Goenda Baradacharan

European 

Auguste Dupin
Marcus Didius Falco
Erast Fandorin 
Sherlock Holmes
Tintin
Miss Marple
Hercule Poirot
Mma Precious Ramotswe
Cormoran Strike
Varg Veum

Comics, graphic novels, and manga 

Tintin
Detective Conan
Batman
The Kindaichi Case Files
Jessica Jones
Rip Kirby
L. Lawliet
Sam & Max
Dick Tracy
Eddie Valiant
Tracer Bullet

Film and television 

Paul Drake  (Perry Mason)
Angel (Buffy the Vampire Slayer)
Chip n' Dale from Rescue Rangers iterations.
Phryne Fisher
Laura Holt
Thomas Magnum
Richard Castle
Jessica Jones
Joe Mannix
Veronica Mars
Michael Westen
Adrian Monk
Jim Rockford
Simon & Simon
Shawn Spencer
Sherlock Hound
Hetty Wainthropp
Frank Marker
Frankie Drake
Nick and Nora Charles

Mike Ehrmantraut

Children's fiction 

Basil of Baker Street
The Bloodhound Gang (Amateur juvenile detectives)
Nancy Drew (Amateur juvenile detective)
The Hardy Boys (Amateur juvenile detectives)
Three Investigators (Amateur juvenile detectives)
Encyclopedia Brown (Amateur juvenile detective)

In games

Booker DeWitt (BioShock: Infinite)
Tex Murphy (Tex Murphy)
Sam & Max (Sam & Max)
Gabriel Knight (Gabriel Knight)
Nick Valentine (Fallout 4)
Paul Prospero (The Vanishing of Ethan Carter)
Takayuki Yagami (Judgment)

See also

Bounty hunter
Detective
Hotel detective
Store detective
Insurance investigator
Investigative journalism
Mercenary
Private Military Companies
Mystery film
Numerical analysis software : i.e. SAS, Palantir Technologies Gotham 
Private police
Company police
World Association of Detectives

References

External links

 Bureau of Labor Statistics information

 
Criminal investigation
Law enforcement occupations